"King James" is a song by Nigerian hip hop recording artist M.I. It was released on August 21, 2014, by Chocolate City. The song was written and produced by the rapper. It was serviced to radio stations in Nigeria, Kenya, Malawi and South Africa. In "King James", M.I proclaims to be the "best rapper alive". Critical reception to "King James" was generally mixed. M.I told the media the song is a non-profit project designed to create awareness and inspire social change.

Background and lyric video
"King James" is a self adulation track with a reggae melody. Prior to its release, M.I hinted to possibly retiring. It has been alleged that "King James" was indirectly directed at Olamide. The lyric video for the song was uploaded onto YouTube on August 21, 2014.

Art exhibition
In a bid to promote "King James" and touch-based on a wide variety of topics, M.I held an art exhibition/leadership symposium at the Terra Culture in Victoria Island, Lagos. Speakers at the event included Akinwunmi Ambode, Audu Maikori, Toyosi Akerele and Adebola Williams. During the event, M.I said the song will not be part of his third studio album, The Chairman (2014).

Critical reception
Upon its release, "King James" was met with mixed reviews from music critics. Oscar Okeke of Lobatan commended the song's production, brevity and flow, while rejecting its lines. Okeke extensively said, "The blaring sound on the instrumentals will rob you of your attention as soon as you hear it. It's like a soft siren. In 2minutes, he is done rapping. He sought to make a point, and in that short time the message was crystal clear." Jim Donnett gave the song 4.5 stars, adding, "M.I finished work on King James reclaiming a throne that he wasn't exactly unseated from while throwing his weight around as Naija's best rapper alive. M.I's King James is a fine brag and it's worth every word (and sound) of it."

References

External links

2014 singles
2014 songs
Nigerian hip hop songs
M.I songs